Anna von Helmholtz (née von Mohl; 19 September 1834 – 1 December 1899), was a German salonnière and writer who translated or edited the translations of a number of scientific works. She was the second wife of the physicist, Hermann von Helmholtz. Brought up in a circle in which intelligence and character were equally well developed, she was described as being talented and clever, with wide views and high aspirations.

Early life
Anna von Mohl was born in Tübingen, 19 September 1834. Her father was Robert von Mohl, a Heidelberg professor, and a liberal member of the Frankfurt National Assembly. She had at least one sibling, a sister, Ida von Schmidt-Zabierow.

Anna spent long periods in Paris, staying with her uncle Julius von Mohl, Professor of Persian language at the College de France. His wife, Mary, was from England, and Anna went to her several times for long visits in Paris and England, where Anna acquired French and English manners and customs.

Career
Helmholtz translated or edited the translations of a number of scientific works. Working with Estelle du Bois-Reymond, daughter of physiologist Emil du Bois-Reymond, they translated Oliver Lodge's Modern Views of Electricity (Neueste Anschauungen über Electricität. Leipzig 1896). With Clara Wiedemann she edited the translations of two of John Tyndall's books: Heat Considered as a Mode of Motion (Wärme betrachtet als eine Art der Bewegung, Braunschweig, 4th edition, 1894) and Sound: A Course of Eight Lectures (Der Schall, 3rd edition, 1897). Her work on the third edition of Tyndall's Heat was so good that Tyndall sent her a brooch in appreciation, and wrote to her that the German edition looked 'far better than the English edition and leaves the French nowhere.'

Salon
Helmholtz was well known in Berlin intellectual circles. In the salons of the time, each salonniere usually had a specific day people would meet in their home. The "Tuesdays" of Helmholtz were given special significance, above all, because they attracted a particularly large number of scholars, especially naturalists. For the first time, the country's academic elite was offered a first-class social floor. As an interface between the court society, the artists' scene and the educated middle classes, their house became the most important salon in the young empire and the prototype of bourgeois conviviality in the late 19th century. Her frequent guests included:

Personal life
On 16 May 1861, she married von Helmholtz. Together they had three children: Robert von Helmholtz (1862–1889), Ellen von Helmholtz  (1864–1941), ⚭ 1884 married Arnold von Siemens (1853–1918), and Friedrich Julius von Helmholtz (1868–1901).

In December 1899, Anna died while on vacation in Volosca, Istria, Croatia, and is buried in Wannsee Cemetery in Berlin.

References

Attribution

Bibliography
 
 
 
 Werner, Franz: Hermann Helmholtz’ Heidelberger Jahre (1858–1871). Sonderveröffentlichungen des Stadtarchivs Heidelberg, Bd. 8. Springer,  Berlin / Heidelberg 1997. Mit 52 Abbildungen. (in German)
 Werner, Franz: "'Möget Ihr Euch freuen dürfen Alles Guten, Warmen, Herzbeglückenden'. Ein Brief der Witwe Anna von Helmholtz an die Witwe Cosima Wagner vom Heiligabend 1894 und die Rolle der Frau am Ende des 19. Jahrhunderts." In: Festschrift 175 Jahre Helmholtz-Gymnasium Heidelberg. 1835–2010. pp. 70–92. (in German)
 Wilhelmy, Petra: Der Berliner Salon im 19. Jahrhundert. Walter de Gruyter, Berlin u. a. 1989, pp. 283–290, 659–669. (in German)

Further reading
 Ellen v. Siemens-Helmholtz (Hrsg.): Anna von Helmholtz. Ein Lebensbild in Briefen. 2 Bände. Verlag für Kulturpolitik, Leipzig 1929. (in German)

1834 births
1899 deaths
19th-century German writers
19th-century German women writers
German salon-holders
People from Tübingen